Polyrhaphis confusa is a species of beetle in the family Cerambycidae. It was described by Lane in 1978. It is known from Brazil.

References

Polyrhaphidini
Beetles described in 1978